This is a list of electoral results for the Doutta Galla Province in Victorian state elections.

Members for Doutta Galla Province

Election results

Elections in the 2000s

Elections in the 1990s

This election was caused by the vacancy following the resignation of David White, who unsuccessfully contested the lower house seat of Tullamarine.

 This by-election was caused by the resignation of John Brumby, who successfully contested the 1993 Broadmeadows state by-election and moved to the Lower House after being elected leader of the Labor party.

 This by-election was caused by the resignation of Bill Landeryou. Preferences were not distributed.

Elections in the 1980s

Elections in the 1970s

 This by-election was caused by the death of John Tripovich. Preferences were not distributed.

 Two party preferred vote was estimated.

 Two party preferred vote was estimated.

Elections in the 1960s

 This by-election was caused by the death of Bill Slater.

Elections in the 1950s

 Two party preferred vote was estimated.

References

Victoria (Australia) state electoral results by district